André Lourenço Duarte (born 12 September 1997), is a Portuguese professional footballer who plays as a defender for Romanian Liga I side FC U Craiova 1948. Duarte started his career in Portugal at Sacavenense, subsequently playing for teams such as: Alverca, Praiense  or Estrela da Amadora.

References

External links
 
 

1997 births
Living people
Footballers from Lisbon
Portuguese footballers
Association football defenders
Campeonato de Portugal (league) players
Liga Portugal 2 players
Liga I players
F.C. Alverca players
S.C. Praiense players
C.F. Estrela da Amadora players
FC U Craiova 1948 players
Portuguese expatriate footballers
Portuguese expatriate sportspeople in Romania
Expatriate footballers in Romania